Tellurian is the second studio album by Swedish progressive metal/rock band Soen, released on 11 November 2014 via Spinefarm Records.

Track listing

Credits
 Joel Ekelöf – vocals
 Joakim Platbarzdis – guitar
 Stefan Stenberg – bass guitar
 Christian Andolf – bass guitar
 Martin Lopez – drums

Production
 Joakim Platbarzdis – production
 Martin Lopez – co-production
 David Bottrill – engineering, mixing
 Adam Ayan – mastering
 José Luis López Galván – artwork

References

2014 albums
Soen albums